Vasily Mikhailovich Goncharov (1861 – 23 August 1915) was a Russian film director and screenwriter, one of the pioneers of the film industry in the Russian Empire, who directed an early Russian feature film Defence of Sevastopol.

Filmography

References

External links 
 

1861 births
1915 deaths
Film directors from the Russian Empire
Male screenwriters
Russian male writers
Silent film directors
20th-century Russian screenwriters
20th-century Russian male writers